Songs for Christmas (stylized as Sufjan Stevens Presents Songs for Christmas on the cover) is a box set of five separate EPs of Christmas-related songs and carols recorded by independent musician Sufjan Stevens between 2001 and 2006. The EPs had been given as gifts to friends and family of Stevens over the past six years, except for 2004 when he was too busy recording the Illinois album. Though the first three EPs had already been available on Sufjan Stevens-related fansites for several years, Songs for Christmas is the first official release of these EPs. Most of the tracks are versions of traditional Christmas songs, with a number of original compositions such as "Sister Winter" and "Star of Wonder". Sufjan Stevens has developed a reputation for being a devoted Christian and many of the songs he chose for inclusion on Songs for Christmas are religious in nature, including his original compositions.

The box set includes a poster of Sufjan Stevens, an animated short for "Put the Lights on the Tree" by Tom Eaton, an essay by Rick Moody, two original short stories by Stevens, stickers, comics and a sing-a-long book for all five discs.

During Stevens' international tour in the later half of 2006, he regularly performed the original song "That Was the Worst Christmas Ever!" while releasing inflatable Santas into the audience for fun.

Songs for Christmas was generally well received by music critics.

Stevens released a follow up, Silver and Gold: Songs for Christmas, Vols. 6-10, in November 2012, which contains a further 58 original and traditional songs.

Track listing
Noel: Songs for Christmas, Vol. I
Recorded December 2001
"Silent Night" – 0:47 (music by Franz X. Gruber)
"O Come, O Come Emmanuel" – 3:59 (words: Traditional, translated from Latin to English by John M. Neale; music: "Veni Emmanuel")
"We're Goin' to the Country!" – 2:19 (words & music by Sufjan Stevens)
"Lo! How a Rose E'er Blooming" – 3:25 (words: 15th Century German carol translated by Theodore Baker; music: Anonymous, originally arranged by Michael Praetorius)
"It's Christmas! Let's Be Glad!" – 1:58 (words & music by Sufjan Stevens)
"Holy Holy, etc." – 0:39 (music: John B. Dyke, arranged here by Matt Morgan)
"Amazing Grace" – 4:00 (words: John Newton; music: Traditional)

Hark!: Songs for Christmas, Vol. II
Recorded December 2002
"Angels We Have Heard on High" – 0:47 (music by Edward S. Barnes)
"Put The Lights On The Tree" – 1:50 (words & music by Sufjan Stevens)
"Come Thou Fount of Every Blessing" – 4:45 (words: Robert Robinson; music: Traditional [American Melody])
"I Saw Three Ships" – 2:36 (words: Traditional; music: Richard W. Adams)
"Only at Christmas Time" – 2:18 (words & music by Sufjan Stevens)
"Once in Royal David's City" – 3:45 (words: Cecil Alexander; music; Henry Gauntlett)
"Hark! The Herald Angels Sing!" – 0:49 (words: Charles Wesley; music: Mendelssohn)
"What Child Is This Anyway?" – 6:51 (words: William C. Dix; music: "Greensleeves")
"Bring a Torch, Jeanette, Isabella" – 1:32 (Traditional French Carol)

Ding! Dong!: Songs for Christmas, Vol. III
Recorded December 2003
"O Come, O Come Emmanuel" – 1:03 (Traditional)
"Come On! Let's Boogey to the Elf Dance!" – 3:50 (words & music by Sufjan Stevens)
"We Three Kings" – 3:05 (words & music by John Henry Hopkins)
"O Holy Night" – 3:34 (words: Placide Cappeau; music: Adolph Charles Adam)
"That Was the Worst Christmas Ever!" – 2:52 (words & music by Sufjan Stevens)
"Ding! Dong!" – 0:56 (music by Sufjan Stevens)
"All the King's Horns" – 2:59 (words & music by Sufjan Stevens)
"The Friendly Beasts" – 3:41 (Traditional French Carol)

Joy: Songs for Christmas, Vol. IV
Recorded December 2005
"The Little Drummer Boy" – 3:44 (words & music by Katherine K. Davis, Henry Onorati and Harry Simeone)
"Away in a Manger" – 2:54 (words: verses 1 & 2, Anonymous, verse 3 by John T. McFarland; music: "Mueller" by James R. Murray)
"Hey Guys! It's Christmas Time!" – 4:41 (words & music by Sufjan Stevens)
"The First Noel" – 0:53 (Traditional)
"Did I Make You Cry on Christmas? (Well, You Deserved It!)" – 3:22 (words & music by Sufjan Stevens)
"The Incarnation" – 2:23 (music by Sufjan Stevens)
"Joy to the World" – 4:21 (words: Isaac Watts; music: Lowell Mason)

Peace: Songs for Christmas, Vol. V
Recorded June 2006
"Once in Royal David's City" – 2:01 (music by Henry Gauntlett)
"Get Behind Me, Santa!" – 3:49 (words & music by Sufjan Stevens)
"Jingle Bells" – 0:36 (music James Pierpont)
"Christmas in July" – 3:17 (words & music by Sufjan Stevens)
"Lo! How a Rose E'er Blooming" – 1:46 (Anonymous)
"Jupiter Winter" – 3:51 (words & music by Sufjan Stevens)
"Sister Winter" – 5:05 (words & music by Sufjan Stevens)
"O Come, O Come Emmanuel" – 1:06 (Traditional)
"Star of Wonder" – 7:08 (words & music by Sufjan Stevens)
"Holy, Holy, Holy" – 3:50 (words by Reginald Heber; music by John B. Dykes)
"The Winter Solstice" – 3:23 (music by Sufjan Stevens)

Sales chart history

References

External links
Songs For Christmas at Asthmatic Kitty Records

2006 Christmas albums
2006 compilation albums
Christmas compilation albums
Albums produced by Sufjan Stevens
Asthmatic Kitty compilation albums
Christmas albums by American artists
Sufjan Stevens compilation albums
Folk Christmas albums